Katradevi is a village in Rajapur taluka in Ratnagiri district of Maharashtra, India.

References

Villages in Ratnagiri district